Olesea Cojuhari (born 29 March 1990 in Chişinău) is a Moldovan sprinter who specializes in the 400 metres. She represented Moldova at the 2012 Summer Olympics.

References 

Sportspeople from Chișinău
1990 births
Living people
Moldovan female sprinters
Athletes (track and field) at the 2012 Summer Olympics
Olympic athletes of Moldova
World Athletics Championships athletes for Moldova
Athletes (track and field) at the 2015 European Games
European Games competitors for Moldova
Olympic female sprinters